The Chicanx Latinx Law Review (CLLR; formerly Chicana/o-Latina/o Law Review, Chicano Law Review and Chicano-Latino Law Review) is a student-edited and produced law journal at the University of California, Los Angeles School of Law. Established in 1972, it is the first law journal in the United States to focus primarily on how law and policy affect the Chicana/o and Latina/o community within the country. Today, the student publication includes reputable scholarly work on an array of topics, such as affirmative action and education, Spanish and Mexican land grants, environmental justice, language rights, and immigration reform. It has been cited as a persuasive authority in courtrooms across the country.

Overview

From the beginning of its publication, the most pervasive issue addressed in the Chicanx Latinx Law Review is immigration. Within this topic there have been numerous articles addressing immigration reform laws, immigration restrictions, the process of immigrating to the United States, and the troubles immigrants face once arriving in the United States. Throughout the nearly 40 years of the journal's publication, the subject of immigration has come up repeatedly.

Schooling is also a common topic of import in multiple articles throughout the CLLR's publication. Under this heading have been articles on primary schooling, secondary education, the quality of public schools, affirmative action, and graduate and undergraduate schooling and opportunities for the Latino community in the United States. Many articles have focused on the role UCLA plays in the education and betterment of the Latinx community. Throughout its publication, the law review has been self-evaluative, often looking at the UCLA community's effect on Latinx students.

There have been many articles discussing the formation of the Latinx identity within the United States, especially topics involving the importance of language. The issue of language, within schools and in the greater US society at large, is examined closely in many articles that have been published in CLLR throughout its history. Policies on language and language requirements have been examined and critiqued. Articles discussing language acquisition and how language restrictions affect the greater Latinx community in the United States are also commonly found within the journal's publication history.

Other common topics and issues that have been covered in the Chicanx Latinx Law Review since its founding are naturalization, employment and undocumented labor, voting and the protection of other fundamental rights, criminal justice in regard to the Latino community, the political mobilization of the Latinx community, and environmental justice.

Notable alumni and contributors
 Laura E. Gómez, one of the founders of critical race theory and a current professor at UCLA School of Law, serves as the journal's faculty advisor and is a frequent contributor to the journal's scholarship.
 Linda Sánchez, who graduated from UCLA Law School in 1995, was editor of the law review. She is the U.S. representative for California's 39th congressional district.
 Kevin R. Johnson is the dean and Mabie-Apallas Professor of Public Interest Law and Chicana/o Studies at UC Davis School of Law. Although not a graduate of UCLA Law School, he has contributed to the law review. His most recent article is "An Essay On the Nomination and Confirmation of the First Latina Justice of the U.S. Supreme Court: Sonia Sotomayor: The Assimilation Demand at Work".
 Gerald P. Lopez, a former law professor at the UCLA School of Law, has written articles for the law review. He is the founder of the Center for Community Problem Solving at New York University School of Law. He has also written four books and many articles on problem solving, race, immigration, health of undocumented Mexicans, and legal education.
 Daniel Olivas, an attorney with the California Department of Justice and a noted author of fiction, poetry, essays and book reviews, served as editor of the law review (1983-1984) during his last year at UCLA School of Law.

References

External links

Law school
American law journals
Law journals edited by students
Publications established in 1972